The 2009 Petit Le Mans powered by Mazda6 was the twelfth running of the Petit Le Mans and the ninth round of the 2009 American Le Mans Series season. It took place at the Road Atlanta circuit in Braselton, Georgia, on September 26, 2009. The race was not restarted and the results were determined from the final lap prior to the stoppage.

When race officials decided to not restart the event Nicolas Minassian and Stéphane Sarrazin of the #08 Peugeot were declared the winners, leading their team car #07. Audi, who had won this race every year since 2000, finished in third and fourth places. This race was the first time Audi lost at Petit Le Mans since its first run since 2000. This was also the first time that neither of the Volkswagen Group marques (Audi and Porsche) won (or finished in the top two, in all cases) its classes. In the LMP2 category Dyson Racing Team won their second race of the season with the #20 Lola-Mazda of Marino Franchitti, Ben Devlin, and Butch Leitzinger ranking 13th overall and 29 laps ahead of their nearest class competitor. The GT2 category was won by Risi Competizione Ferrari leading the Rahal Letterman Racing BMW and Farnbacher-Loles Porsche on the podium.

During Thursday practice on September 24, which took place in dry, sunny conditions, Scott Sharp had a violent crash in the Acura ARX-02a exiting turn one after making contact with the Farnbacher-Loles Porsche entry, which was leaving the pits. Sharp's car turned on its left side, hit the fence, then barrel-rolled three-and-a-half times before landing right-side up. Sharp walked away from the incident. On Friday, September 25, at 9:30 AM Eastern Daylight Time, a new tub arrived from the Honda Performance Development Center in Los Angeles. The Highcroft Racing team then spent the next 24 hours rebuilding the car, getting some assistance from archrival de Ferran Motorsports. The team only used 10 percent of the parts from the original car, and were forced to start the race from pit road.

Report

Qualifying

Qualifying result
Pole position winners in each class are marked in bold.

Race

Race result
Class winners are marked in bold. Cars failing to complete 70% of winner's distance are marked as Not Classified (NC).

References

Petit Le Mans
Petit Le Mans